A list of traditional windmills in Australia.

Locations

New South Wales

Norfolk Island

Queensland

South Australia

Tasmania

Victoria

Western Australia

Notes

Names in bold denote surviving windmills. Known building dates are in bold text. Non-bold text denotes first known date. Unless otherwise stated, the reference for all entries is the linked Windmill World webpage.

References

Australia
 
Windmills
Windmills